Deividas Stagniūnas (born 28 April 1985) is a Lithuanian former ice dancer. With Isabella Tobias, he is the 2011 Skate America bronze medalist and placed in the top ten at two European Championships. They represented Lithuania at the 2014 Winter Olympics, where Stagniūnas was the flagbearer.

Career

Early years 
Stagniūnas began skating at age five. He moved to the United States at age 15 to skate with a partner.

Early in his career, Stagniūnas was coached by Walter Wielunski and Natalia Dubova, who trained him in ice dancing. They trained in Darien, Illinois, where he lived with his partner, Laura Whipple. He and Whipple won the senior bronze medal at the Lake Placid ice dancing competition, representing Lithuania. In the 2003–2004 season, Stagniūnas began skating with Kayla Nicole Frey. They competed internationally on the junior level and were three-time (2004–2006) Lithuanian silver medalists.

Partnership with Copely 
In 2006, Stagniūnas formed a partnership with American Katherine Copely. They became the 2007 Lithuanian national champions and 2006 and 2007 Golden Spin of Zagreb bronze medalists. The duo qualified an entry for the 2010 Winter Olympics in the ice dancing event when they placed 14th at the 2009 World Championships. According to IOC rules, competitors must have citizenship of the country they are representing; however, Copely's special request for citizenship was denied by Lithuanian President Dalia Grybauskaitė. The spot was left unfilled. Copely retired from competition due to an injury which was subsequently treated arthroscopically, followed by a complete recovery. She is currently attending medical school in the U.S.

Partnership with Tobias 
In spring 2010, Stagniūnas teamed up with American ice dancer Isabella Tobias. They initially trained under Igor Shpilband and Marina Zueva in Canton, Michigan. Tobias/Stagniūnas made their debut at the 2010 Nebelhorn Trophy, where they placed 11th, and won their first international medal, bronze, at the 2010 NRW Trophy. At their first European and World Championships, they placed 12th and 14th, respectively.

Tobias/Stagniūnas won bronze at a Grand Prix event, the 2011 Skate America. In June 2012, they moved from Canton, Michigan to Novi, Michigan, following coach Igor Shpilband. According to IOC rules, Olympic competitors must be citizens of the country they are representing. In order to allow the team to compete at the 2014 Winter Olympics, Tobias submitted an application for Lithuanian citizenship in October 2012. It was denied on 7 January 2013.

Tobias/Stagniūnas withdrew from the 2013 European Championships as a result of Stagniūnas' back problem. By finishing 15th at the 2013 World Championships in London, Ontario, they qualified a spot for Lithuania in the Olympic ice dancing event. Tobias was granted Lithuanian citizenship in December 2013. Tobias/Stagniūnas placed ninth at the 2014 European Championships in January in Budapest, 17th at the 2014 Winter Olympics in February in Sochi, and then 15th at the 2014 World Championships in March in Saitama. On 2 May 2014 Stagniūnas announced his competitive retirement due to recurring injuries.

Programs

With Tobias

With Copely

Results 
GP: Grand Prix; JGP: Junior Grand Prix

With Tobias

With Copely

With Frey

References

External links 

 
 
 
  Copely & Stagniunas official site

Lithuanian male ice dancers
1985 births
Living people
Sportspeople from Kaunas
Olympic figure skaters of Lithuania
Figure skaters at the 2014 Winter Olympics